Dogpound Shuffle (also known as Spot) is a 1975 comedy film written and directed by Jeffrey Bloom and starring David Soul and Ron Moody.

Plot
Two drifters, a former vaudeville dancer and a boxer, bond with a stray dog. When their dog is accidentally impounded, they form a song-and-dance act to raise money for the dog's release.

Production
The film was financed by Lew Grade because he felt it had a possibility for a TV series. Grade never made a TV series based on the film, but because so little money was involved, he said he did not lose money on it.

References

External links

1975 films
1975 comedy films
ITC Entertainment films
1975 directorial debut films
Films produced by Elliott Kastner
1970s English-language films
Films directed by Jeffrey Bloom